The  is a historical museum located at 1-4-1 Yokoami, Sumida-Ku, Tokyo in the Ryogoku district. The museum opened in March 1993 to preserve Edo's cultural heritage, and features city models of Edo and Tokyo between 1590 (just prior to the Edo period beginning) and 1964. It was the first museum built dedicated to the history of Tokyo. Some main features of the permanent exhibitions are the life-size replica of the Nihonbashi, which was the bridge leading into Edo; scale models of towns and buildings across the Edo Meiji, and Showa periods; and the Nakamuraza theatre.

Designed by Kiyonori Kikutake, the building is 62.2 meters tall and covers 30,000 square meters. The concrete exterior is designed based on a traditional rice storehouse (takayuka-shiki style) and is the same height as the Edo Castle. Kikutake claimed that the building "crystallizes Japanese culture in built form," concerning the structure's traditional references but contemporary execution. There are eight floors, one below ground and seven elevated off the ground by four columns, with an open air plaza at ground level. The first floor has a museum shop, restaurants, and a ticket counter. The primary entrance is on the third floor, reached by a bright red escalator from the plaza. The fifth and sixth floors contain permanent exhibits, with temporary special and feature exhibits on the first and fifth floors. The seventh floor is a library that houses 560,000 texts and cultural items related to Edo and Tokyo.

The museum opened thirteen years after the Shitamachi Museum and six years after the Fukagawa Edo Museum, all part of a national trend for building local history museums. The exhibits for all three were primarily designed by Total Media.

Formerly owned and operated by the Tokyo Metropolitan Government, the Edo-Tokyo Museum is accented by the Edo-Tokyo Open Air Architectural Museum across the city in Koganei Park. The Edo-Tokyo Museum is now operated by the Tokyo Metropolitan Foundation for History and Culture.

The museum was closed for renovation in April 2022 and is expected to be reopened by the end of 2025.

Design and Architecture 

Kikutake was selected as the architect through a closed competition conducted by the Tokyo city hall. Kikutake designed the Metabolist structure with the goal of projecting Japan as a nation and culture, with Tokyo specifically as a world city. The organization that directed the museum, Total Media, led by Ogi Shinzo, wanted to use the museum to define Japan through the everyday life of shomin (庶民), or average citizens. Emporis classifies the $300 million structure as a high-rise building.

The concept of an Edo-Tokyo Museum was imagined in the early 1980s by Tokyo governor Suzuki Shun'ichi as part of the Expo' 70 tenth anniversary campaign "My Town Tokyo." Nine companies were involved with the museum's construction, organized by Kajima Corporation. The site location was chosen mainly because the Ukiyo-e painter Katsushika Hokusai was born in the Sumida ward, and Edo culture was born and flourished in Ryogoku.

Kyoto roofs reflecting sunlight inspired the whitish silver color of the outside. Likewise, the roof-like shape that defines the building derives from the distinctive roofs of old Japanese temples. The roofs of these monuments, Kikutake says, differentiate them from other structures while simultaneously cohering with the landscape. The four legs were erected first, followed by the cantilevers. The first elevated floor is supported on the legs' 19.7' deep bottom chords, while a second set of chords supports the other floors. Each of the four composite steel with reinforced concrete legs is a 46' deep "H" shape. From the plaza to the first raised floor, they are 63' tall. The building is cantilevered 119' over the legs on the North and South sides. Fluorine resin-coated square panels cover the building.

To protect the artifacts from vibrations and earthquakes, 126 springs are positioned throughout the overhang capable of absorbing 3.5 inches of vertical movement. During the March 11th, 2011 Tohoku earthquake, however, the seventh floor Edo-Tokyo Museum Library reported that shelves became unstable and books fell.

Reception 
While most of the museum's initial reception focused on the exhibits, the building itself garnered general praise in its role in housing the exhibits. William Steele notes that "the building itself is playful," comparing it to a creature from space. Carol Lutfy observes that "the museum embraces the odd blend of history and high-tech that has come to characterize modern-day Tokyo." She argues that the structure serves as a conduit between tradition and contemporary, just as the museum itself does. The museum website claims that the building has architecturally defined the area and attracted tourists due to its unique form.

The unique form of the building, however, has been a source of criticism as well. As the dominant structure in the Ryogoku district, the Edo-Tokyo Museum dwarfs and arguably does not blend with the stylings of the area. Of the nearby structures, only the Ryogoku Kokugikan has similar dimensions, but it is not nearly as visible.

Steele argues that while the interior is well suited for the exhibits, the artificial divide it creates between Edo and Tokyo is problematic. The permanent exhibit floor ignores the continuity between Edo and Tokyo periods, Steele claims, because the floor plan divides the rooms into two divergent spaces.

Barrie Shelton argues that the building is distinctly Japanese in its monumentality and "visually self-contained", focusing more attention on the plaza below and its connection to the building, than the building itself.

See also

References

External links

 
 Japan-guide.com

+
Museums in Tokyo
History museums in Japan
Buildings and structures in Sumida, Tokyo
Museums established in 1993
1993 establishments in Japan
Ukiyo-e Museum